John "Jackie" Sewell (24 January 1927 – 26 September 2016) was an England International footballer. He played for several teams including Sheffield Wednesday, Notts County and Aston Villa. When he was transferred to Sheffield Wednesday from Notts County, for £34,500, he was the most expensive signing in English football. When Sewell captained the newly independent nation of Zambia in October 1964, he became one of the few footballers who have played for two different countries. He was the last living footballer who played in the Match of the Century on 25 November 1953.

Career

Notts County

Jackie Sewell was born in Kells, Whitehaven, Cumberland, and began his career at miners club Kells Centre. Sewell was spotted by Notts County in a Cumberland League match against Workington, leading to a trial. Sewell then began his professional footballing career at Notts County, for whom he was a prolific goalscorer. He was an important member of the team which won the Football League Third Division South for the 1949–50 season. He scored 97 goals in 178 league appearances for the club.

Sheffield Wednesday
He signed for Sheffield Wednesday in March 1951, playing 175 games and scoring 92 goals in his four years at Hillsborough. He joined Aston Villa in December 1955. During his time at Hillsborough he earned 6 England caps, scoring 3 goals.

Aston Villa
He joined Aston Villa in December 1955 for £20,000, and he played 145 matches for them until October 1959. He was then sold to Hull City. He was part of the FA Cup winning team of 1957.

Hull City and coaching
He moved from Aston Villa to Hull City before retiring as a player in 1961. He then moved to Northern Rhodesia and became player-coach for City of Lusaka. He later coached teams in Rhodesia (Zimbabwe) and the Belgian Congo (now known as the Democratic Republic of Congo).

International career
Jackie Sewell gained six caps for England, scoring three goals, one in England's historic defeat against Hungary in 1953. He also captained the Zambia national team when the country gained its independence from Britain in 1964. He made 10 appearances for Zambia between 1964 and 1965, scoring seven goals.

References

Bibliography

1927 births
2016 deaths
Sportspeople from Whitehaven
English footballers
England international footballers
Notts County F.C. players
Sheffield Wednesday F.C. players
Aston Villa F.C. players
Hull City A.F.C. players
City of Lusaka F.C. players
Zambian footballers
Zambia international footballers
Zambia national football team managers
Zambian football managers
English Football League players
English Football League representative players
Dual internationalists (football)
White Zambian people
Association football forwards
FA Cup Final players
Footballers from Cumbria
Association football coaches